Sumin may refer to

Sumin, Brodnica County in Kuyavian-Pomeranian Voivodeship (north-central Poland)
Sumin, Lipno County in Kuyavian-Pomeranian Voivodeship (north-central Poland)
Sumin, Tomaszów Lubelski County in Lublin Voivodeship (east Poland)
Sumin, Włodawa County in Lublin Voivodeship (east Poland)
Sumin, Greater Poland Voivodeship (west-central Poland)
Sumin, Pomeranian Voivodeship (north Poland)
Sumin, Warmian-Masurian Voivodeship (north Poland)

People with the surname Sumin:
Avenir Sumin (1858–1933), Russian jewellery-maker
Aleksandr Sumin (born 1995), Russian football player
Bae Su-min (born 2001), member of K-Pop group STAYC
Pyotr Sumin (1946–2011), governor of Chelyabinsk Oblast, Russia

See also

Soo-min, Korean given name also spelled Su-min